Nikolaos "Nikos" Pappas (Greek: Νικόλαος "Νίκος" Παππάς, born July 11, 1990) is a Greek professional basketball player for Panathinaikos of the Greek Basket League and the EuroLeague.  He stands at  meters of height and plays at the shooting guard position.

Early years
Pappas is from Aidipsos in where he grew up. He started his career from the local club Syllas.Then, he transferred to Locros Atalanti.
His mother is Greek Cypriot from Famagusta.

Professional career

Pappas made his professional debut in the Greek League with Panellinios, during the 2006–07 season. He made his debut in Europe's continent-wide second-tier level competition, the EuroCup, with Panellinios, during the 2007–08 season. He signed a 5-year contract with the Spanish League club Bilbao Basket in 2008.

He was loaned to the reserve team of Real Madrid, Real Madrid B, of the Spanish 4th Division, for the 2008–09 season. He was loaned to the Greek League club Kolossos Rodou for the 2009–10 and 2010–11 seasons. He was named the 2010 Greek League Best Young Player. In February 2012, he joined PAOK. He moved to Panionios for the 2012–13 season. With Panionios, he was the Greek League Top Scorer, and a member of the Greek League Best Five, in 2013.

Panathinaikos (2013–2020)
On 20 June 2013, Pappas joined the Greek club Panathinaikos. He was announced as a new player of Panathinaikos, for the following three seasons, along with his Panionios teammate Vlado Janković. During his second season with Panathinaikos, Pappas switched his jersey number from 15 to 11.

On 22 April 2015, after winning his first EuroLeague MVP of the Round award, after the third week's game of the EuroLeague playoffs, in which he scored 25 points against CSKA Moscow, it was officially announced that Pappas had renewed his contract with Panathinaikos, until 2018. On 16 May 2015, Pappas suffered a torn ACL injury, and a tear of his meniscus, in a Greek League game against Kolossos Rodou, after falling awkwardly, after being fouled on a play by Vassilis Toliopoulos. He was operated on the day after, and his return to playing basketball was scheduled at 5–6 months time, at the earliest. On November 30, 2015, in a Greek League game against Lavrio, Pappas made his first re-appearance in an official game, 6-and-a-half months after his injury. He scored 2 points in the game.

During a press conference on July 3, 2020, it was confirmed by the team's new head coach Georgios Vovoras that Pappas was parting ways with the Athenian club after seven seasons.

Hapoel Jerusalem (2020)
On September 23, 2020, Pappas signed with Hapoel Jerusalem for the duration of the Basketball Champions League Final-8.

Basket Zielona Góra (2021)
On February 23, 2021, he signed with Stelmet Zielona Góra of the Polish League.

AEK (2021–2022)
On August 16, 2021, Pappas signed with AEK Athens of the Greek Basket League. He was constantly plagued by injuries and he also spent the final stretch of the season under suspension, after falling out with new coach Curro Segura, who took over the team after Stefanos Dedas signed with CSKA Moscow. In 12 league games, he averaged 12.4 points, 2.5 rebounds, 2.8 assists and 1.4 steals, playing around 27 minutes per contest.

Final season with Panathinaikos (2022–present)
After assisting the team in the pre-season, on December 3, 2022, Pappas was signed on for the rest of the 2022–2023 campaign in order to close out his playing career with his beloved Panathinaikos. He made his debut on December 11 of 2022 in a game against AEK BC. Reportedly, he pledged to donate the entirety of his contract pay to the sanitation workers at the Athens Olympic Stadium complex.

National team career

Greek junior national team
As a member of the junior national basketball teams of Greece, Pappas won the silver medal at the 2007 FIBA Europe Under-18 Championship. He was named the MVP of the 2008 Albert Schweitzer Tournament, where he also helped lead Greece to defeat Team USA Under-18 during the tournament, by scoring 27 points in the game against the USA. He also won the gold medal at the 2008 FIBA Europe Under-18 Championship, where he was also voted to the All-Tournament Team. 

Pappas also played at the 2009 Nike Hoop Summit, where he helped the World Select Team to defeat Team USA 97–89. He also won the silver medal at the 2009 FIBA Under-19 World Cup with Greece's junior national team, where he was also voted to the All-Tournament Team. Pappas also won the gold medal at the 2009 FIBA Europe Under-20 Championship and the silver medal at the 2010 FIBA Europe Under-20 Championship, where he was named to the All-Tournament Team after leading the tournament in scoring.

Greek senior national team
Pappas first trained with the senior men's Greek national basketball team in 2010. In the summer of 2016, it was reported that Pappas was interested in playing with the senior Cypriot national basketball team, due to his mother's Greek Cypriot origins. However, in 2017, he was re-called to Greece's senior national team. 

On 19 August 2017, he scored 22 points (career high with the senior Greek NT) in a friendly game against Great Britain, in London. He then played with Greece at the EuroBasket 2017.

Player profile
Pappas began his career playing as a combo guard with the junior national teams of Greece, and in his early club career. After maturing as a player, he became more of a pure shooting guard who can occasionally operate as a swingman.

Career statistics

EuroLeague

|-
| style="text-align:left;"| 2013–14
| style="text-align:left;"| Panathinaikos
| 13 || 2 || 8.6 || .467 || .385 || .750 || .8 || .5 || .3 || .1 || 4.8 || 3.5
|-
| style="text-align:left;"| 2014–15
| style="text-align:left;"| Panathinaikos
| 22 || 1 || 20.3 || .487 || .387 || .909 || 2.3 || 1.9 || .8 || .1 || 10.8 || 12.2
|-
| style="text-align:left;"| 2015–16
| style="text-align:left;"| Panathinaikos
| 5 || 0 || 8.3 || .444 || .000 || .700 || .4 || .4 || .0 || .0 || 3.0 || 2.6
|-
| style="text-align:left;"| 2016–17
| style="text-align:left;"| Panathinaikos
| 29 || 2 || 17.2 || .426 || .260 || .764 || 1.6 || 1.3 || .6 || .1 || 5.5 || 5.0
|-
| style="text-align:left;"| 2017–18
| style="text-align:left;"| Panathinaikos
| 32 || 1 || 17.6 || .423|| .324 || .776 || 1.1 || .9 || .6 || .4 || 8.2 || 5.8
|-
| style="text-align:left;"| 2018–19
| style="text-align:left;"| Panathinaikos
| 19 || 5 || 17.9 || .342 || .271 || .826 || 1.0 || 1.2 || .8 || .0 || 6.8 || 4.2
|-
| style="text-align:left;"| 2019–20
| style="text-align:left;"| Panathinaikos
| 10 || 2 || 11.6 || .417 || .375 || .750 || 1.3 || .9 || .4 || .1 || 4.4 || 3.5
|- class="sortbottom"
| style="text-align:left;"| Career
| style="text-align:left;"|
| 130 || 13 || 14.5 || .507 || .316 || .808 || 1.4 || 1.1 || .6 || .1 || 6.2 ||5.2

Awards and accomplishments

Pro career
Greek League Best Young Player: (2010)
4× Greek League All-Star: (2013, 2014, 2018, 2020)
Greek League All-Star Game MVP: (2014)
Greek League Top Scorer: (2013)
Greek League Best Five: (2013)
5× Greek Cup Winner: (2014, 2015, 2016, 2017, 2019)
5× Greek League Champion: (2014, 2017, 2018, 2019, 2020)
EuroLeague MVP of the Round: 2015 (Playoff Game 3)

Greek junior national team
2007 ISF World Schools' Championship: 
2007 ISF World Schools' Championship: Top Scorer
2007 ISF World Schools' Championship: MVP (40 points in the final)
2007 FIBA Europe Under-18 Championship: 
2008 Albert Schweitzer Tournament: 
2008 Albert Schweitzer Tournament: Top Scorer
2008 Albert Schweitzer Tournament: MVP
2008 FIBA Europe Under-18 Championship: 
2008 FIBA Europe Under-18 Championship: All-Tournament Team
2009 FIBA Under-19 World Cup: 
2009 FIBA Under-19 World Cup: All-Tournament Team
2009 FIBA Europe Under-20 Championship: 
2010 FIBA Europe Under-20 Championship: 
2010 FIBA Europe Under-20 Championship: Top Scorer
2010 FIBA Europe Under-20 Championship: All-Tournament Team

References

External links

Euroleague.net Profile
FIBA Profile
Eurobasket.com Profile
Greek Basket League Profile 
Hellenic Federation Profile 
Greek Basket League Profile 
Spanish League Profile 
Draftexpress.com Profile

1990 births
Living people
AEK B.C. players
Basket Zielona Góra players
Bilbao Basket players
Cypriot men's basketball players
Greek Basket League players
Greek expatriate basketball people in Spain
Greek men's basketball players
Kolossos Rodou B.C. players
Liga ACB players
Panathinaikos B.C. players
Panellinios B.C. players
Panionios B.C. players
P.A.O.K. BC players
Basketball players from Athens
People from Euboea (regional unit)
Shooting guards
Sportspeople from Central Greece